Ken's Bar II is the cover album by Japanese pop singer Ken Hirai.

Track listing

Oricon sales charts (Japan)

2009 albums
Ken Hirai albums